Akash Choudhary (born 28 November 1999) is an Indian cricketer. He made his Twenty20 debut for Meghalaya in the 2018–19 Syed Mushtaq Ali Trophy on 21 February 2019. He made his List A debut on 24 September 2019, for Meghalaya in the 2019–20 Vijay Hazare Trophy. He made his first-class debut on 9 December 2019, for Meghalaya in the 2019–20 Ranji Trophy.

References

External links
 

1998 births
Living people
Indian cricketers
Meghalaya cricketers
Place of birth missing (living people)